Panguil Bay Bridge is an under construction  bridge which will connect Tangub, Misamis Occidental and Tubod, Lanao del Norte. The bridge when completed will become the longest water-spanning bridge in the Philippines, surpassing the San Juanico Bridge.

The groundbreaking ceremony for the bridge was held on November 27, 2018. Construction officially began on February 28, 2020.

The bridge is party funded under the Korean Economic Development Cooperation Agreement with South Korean firm Kyong-Ho Engineering and Architect Co. Ltd. involved in the construction. Expenses not covered by the loan will be funded by the Philippine national government.

, the project is more than 50% complete, with partial operations expected by 2023. Upon its completion, travel time between Tangub and Tubod will be cut from 2.5 hours to just a few minutes.

See also
Guicam Bridge

References

Proposed bridges in the Philippines
Buildings and structures in Lanao del Norte
Buildings and structures in Misamis Occidental
 Misamis Occidental